George Jackson (born 10 February 1952) is an English former footballer who played in the Football League for Stoke City.

Career
Jackson was born in Manchester and joined Stoke City as a teenager in 1970. He made twelve appearances for Stoke in the 1971–72 season before suffering a career-ending injury and later became a youth coach at the Victoria Ground.

Career statistics

References

English footballers
Stoke City F.C. players
English Football League players
1952 births
Living people
Association football midfielders